Mill Creek is an unincorporated community in Whitfield County, in the U.S. state of Georgia.

History
The community takes its name from a nearby creek of the same name.

References

Unincorporated communities in Whitfield County, Georgia